Andrea Robin Wood (born March 2, 1973) is an American attorney and jurist serving as a United States district judge of the United States District Court for the Northern District of Illinois.

Early life and education

Wood was born March 2, 1973, in St. Louis, Missouri. She received a Bachelor of Arts degree from the University of Chicago in 1995 and a Juris Doctor in 1998 from Yale Law School.

Career 
Wood served as a law clerk to Judge Diane Wood of the United States Court of Appeals for the Seventh Circuit from 1998 to 1999. From 1999 to 2004, she worked as an associate at the law firm of Kirkland & Ellis, where she was responsible for litigation, primarily in federal court. In 2004, she became a senior attorney at the U.S. Securities and Exchange Commission, where she managed complex investigations and litigation involving securities law. In 2007, she became senior trial counsel in the Division of Enforcement, serving until her appointment to the bench in 2013.

Federal judicial service

On May 6, 2013, President Barack Obama nominated Wood to replace Judge William J. Hibbler, who died on March 19, 2012, in the United States District Court for the Northern District of Illinois. She received a hearing before the Senate Judiciary Committee on June 19, 2013, and her nomination was reported to the floor of the Senate on July 18, 2013, by voice vote. The Senate confirmed her nomination on October 14, 2013, by voice vote. She received her commission on October 15, 2013, and at the time she was sworn in, she was the youngest United States district court judge.

See also 
 List of African-American federal judges
 List of African-American jurists

References

External links

1973 births
Living people
African-American judges
American women lawyers
Illinois lawyers
Judges of the United States District Court for the Northern District of Illinois
Lawyers from St. Louis
United States district court judges appointed by Barack Obama
21st-century American judges
University of Chicago alumni
Yale Law School alumni
People associated with Kirkland & Ellis
21st-century American women judges